Double Happiness sometimes translated as Double Happy, is a Chinese traditional ornament design, commonly used as a decoration symbol of marriage. Outside of China, it is also used in the United States, Europe, East Asia and Southeast Asia.

Characteristics
Double Happiness is a ligature, "囍" composed of 喜喜 – two copies of the Chinese characters  literally meaning joy, compressed to assume the square shape of a standard Chinese character (much as a real character may consist of two parts), and is pronounced simply as xǐ or as a polysyllabic Chinese character, being read as 双喜 (shuāngxǐ).

Typically the character "囍" is written in Chinese calligraphy, and frequently appears on traditional decorative items, associated with marriage. Double happiness symbol also often found all over the wedding ceremony, as well as on gift items given to the bride and groom. The color of the character is usually red, occasionally black.

Since 2017, the version 10 of the Unicode Standard features a rounded version of the character in the "Enclosed Ideographic Supplement" block, at code point .

In popular culture
Nowadays shuāngxǐ (alternative transcriptions, Shuang hsi) is used as a brand names for things like fashion, jewelry, cigarettes, matches, soy sauce, etc. It is also featured as decoration on many items by Chinese luxury brand Shanghai Tang.

Hong Kong lifestyle retail store G.O.D. designs many products themed with the double happiness symbol, including scented candles, accessories and Ming-inspired tableware and tea sets.

Gallery

See also
 Fu character (福), also a common good-luck decorative design
 Lu character (禄), a Chinese character symbolizing prosperity
 Shou character (壽), a Chinese character symbolizing longevity
 Xi character (喜), a Chinese character symbolizing happiness

References

External links

 The Story of the Chinese Character: Double Happiness

Chinese calligraphy
Korean traditions
Chinese traditions
Vietnamese traditions